Hurikaduwa South Grama Niladhari Division is a Grama Niladhari Division of the Kundasale Divisional Secretariat of Kandy District of Central Province, Sri Lanka. It has Grama Niladhari Division Code 679.

Hurikaduwa, Nituletenna, Alakolamaditta and Nittultenna are located within, nearby or associated with Hurikaduwa South.

Hurikaduwa South is a surrounded by the Dodamgolla, Hurikaduwa East, Hurikaduwa North and Manikhinna Grama Niladhari Divisions.

Demographics

Ethnicity 

The Hurikaduwa South Grama Niladhari Division has a Sinhalese majority (99.8%). In comparison, the Kundasale Divisional Secretariat (which contains the Hurikaduwa South Grama Niladhari Division) has a Sinhalese majority (82.6%)

Religion 

The Hurikaduwa South Grama Niladhari Division has a Buddhist majority (99.6%). In comparison, the Kundasale Divisional Secretariat (which contains the Hurikaduwa South Grama Niladhari Division) has a Buddhist majority (81.4%)

Grama Niladhari divisions of Sri Lanka
Kandy District

References